H16 is a national road (H-Highway) in Cherkasy Oblast, Ukraine. 

It starts at the roundabout in H08, at the beginning of the Zolotonosha bypass road, on the outskirts of the village of Zhar, goes south to the Kremenchuk Reservoir, crosses it with the Cherkasy Dam. Then it passes through the cities of Cherkasy, Smila, Shpola, Zvenyhorodka, Talne and ends at the roundabout with the M12 near Uman.

See also

 Roads in Ukraine

References

Roads in Cherkasy Oblast